Peanuts Greatest Hits is the seventh compilation album by jazz pianist Vince Guaraldi (credited to the Vince Guaraldi Trio) released by Fantasy/Concord Records on July 31, 2015. The album gathers Guaraldi's most iconic compositions featured in the animated television specials based on the Peanuts comic strip by Charles M. Schulz.

Background
To celebrate the 50th anniversary of A Charlie Brown Christmas, Fantasy/Concord Records assembled another collection of Guaraldi's best-known songs. 

Peanuts Greatest Hits was released in CD format in July 2015. It was also released in a limited-edition picture disc vinyl format in September 2015, with images of Charlie Brown and Lucy covering each side. To celebrate the 70th anniversary of Peanuts, a second limited-edition picture disc vinyl format featuring images of Snoopy and Woodstock was released by Craft Recordings on July 24, 2020.

Track listing

Personnel 
Credits adapted from CD liner notes
Vince Guaraldi – piano
Monty Budwig – double bass (Tracks 1–5, 7)
Seward McCain – electric bass (Tracks 6, 8)
Fred Marshall – double bass (Tracks 9–12)
Colin Bailey – drums (Track 1–5, 7)
Mike Clark – drums (Tracks 6, 8)
Jerry Granelli – drums (Tracks 9–12)
Tom Harrell – trumpet (Tracks 6, 8)
Chuck Bennett – trombone (Tracks 6, 8)
Emmanuel Klein – trumpet (Track 7)
John Gray – guitar (Track 7)
Ronald Lang – woodwinds (Track 7)
John Scott Trotter – orchestrator (Tracks 6, 8)

References

2015 compilation albums
Albums arranged by Vince Guaraldi
Vince Guaraldi soundtracks
Cool jazz soundtracks
Mainstream jazz soundtracks
Peanuts music
Television animation soundtracks
Vince Guaraldi albums
Vince Guaraldi compilation albums
Fantasy Records compilation albums
Concord Records compilation albums